Mark Killilea Snr (15 January 1897 – 29 September 1970) was an Irish Fianna Fáil politician. He was a Teachta Dála (TD) for constituencies in County Galway for over 30 years, and then a Senator for 8 years.

Biography
Killilea was born in the townland of Cloonnabricka, Ballinamore Bridge, County Galway, to Pat Killilea, a labourer, and Anne Giblin.

Killilea claimed membership of the Irish Volunteers from 1917 and engaged in active service with the Irish Republican Army from April 1918 to September 1923, during the Irish War of Independence and Irish Civil War, in counties Wexford, Galway and Mayo. He was wounded in May 1921.

Killilea was a founder-member of Fianna Fáil and a farmer and shopkeeper before entering politics. He was elected to Dáil Éireann on his first attempt, at the June 1927 general election in the nine-seat Galway constituency. He took his seat in the 5th Dáil, along with the 44 other Fianna Fáil TDs who ended the Republican policy of abstentionism and took the disputed oath of allegiance, dismissing it as an "empty formula".

He was re-elected at the September 1927 general election. However, in the Fianna Fáil victory at the 1932 general election, it won no new seats in Galway. All five sitting Fianna Fáil TDs stood for re-election, but the party ran a total of seven candidates in the constituency and Killilea was one of the two sitting TDs to lose their seats to party colleagues. He was re-elected the following year, displacing Cumann na nGaedheal's Joseph Mongan.

Killilea was then re-elected at all the eight general elections in the next 28 years, switching to the new Galway East constituency when the county's parliamentary representation was split at the 1937 election, and choosing Galway North after a further constituency revision for the 1948 general election.

At the 1961 general election, he lost his seat again, this time in the restored Galway East constituency.  The county's three 3-seat constituencies had been replaced by the 3-seat Galway West and the 5-seat Galway East, where Killilea was one of four sitting Fianna Fáil TDs who stood for re-election. Michael Kitt and Michael Carty had both been returned at the previous general election, and Anthony Millar had won a by-election in 1958. It would have been difficult for Fianna Fáil to win four out of five seats, and with 55% of the first-preference vote the party took three seats: Killilea was the loser.

He then stood for election to Seanad Éireann on the Labour Panel, and was returned to the 10th Seanad. He was re-elected at the 1965 Seanad election to the 11th Seanad, but stood down in 1969 in favour of his son Mark Killilea Jnr, who was elected to the 12th Seanad.

He married Mary Joan Turner in 1930.

Untold Secrets allegations
In 1958 Killilea and his wife fostered Anne Silke, a former resident of the Tuam Mother and Baby Home. Before she died Anne Silke gave evidence reported in the 2021 documentary Untold Secrets that she was beaten and abused while in the family's care and used as little more than a slave. Silke alleged she was physically assaulted by the late Mark Killilea Jnr. She also alleged she was sexually assaulted by another son in the family.

See also
Families in the Oireachtas

References

1897 births
1970 deaths
Fianna Fáil TDs
Irish Republican Army (1919–1922) members
Irish Republican Army (1922–1969) members
Child abuse in the Republic of Ireland
People of the Irish Civil War (Anti-Treaty side)
Members of the 5th Dáil
Members of the 6th Dáil
Members of the 8th Dáil
Members of the 9th Dáil
Members of the 10th Dáil
Members of the 11th Dáil
Members of the 12th Dáil
Members of the 13th Dáil
Members of the 14th Dáil
Members of the 15th Dáil
Members of the 16th Dáil
Members of the 10th Seanad
Members of the 11th Seanad
Politicians from County Galway
Fianna Fáil senators